Mahalakshmi Sreenivasan, better known by her stage name Mohini, is an Indian former actress who has acted in South Indian Tamil, Malayalam, Telugu and Kannada films.

Personal life 
Mohini was born as Mahalakshmi in Thanjavur, Tamil Nadu. She attended Children's Garden Higher Secondary School, Chennai. 

Mohini converted to Christianity in 2006.

Career 

Mohini was a child actress. She acted in the movie Koottu Puzhukkal (1987), starring Raghuvaran and Amala, as the hero's little sister. Mohini made her adult debut as a heroine with Eeramana Rojave and then was selected to act alongside Akshay Kumar in the 1991 Hindi film Dancer, the only hindi film in her career. She has acted in over 100 movies in all South Indian languages, working with directors like Hariharan, Kamal and Singeetham Srinivasa Rao.

Filmography

Television 
 1996 - Kadhal Pagadai (Sun TV) as Sithara
1998- Oru Pennin Kathai (Pothigai TV)
Sherlock Mami (DD podhigai) as Janani
Comedy Utsavam
Chinna Chinna Aasai - Butterflies (also director)
 2006 - Raja Rajeshwari (Sun TV)
 2007-Kathanar Kadamattathu Kathanar (Jaihind TV)
 Krishna
 Neelakkurinji Veendum Pookkunnu

References

External links 
 

Living people
Actresses in Tamil cinema
Actresses in Kannada cinema
Actresses in Telugu cinema
Actresses in Malayalam cinema
Indian film actresses
Actresses in Hindi cinema
20th-century Indian actresses
21st-century Indian actresses
Indian Roman Catholics
Converts to Roman Catholicism from Hinduism
Indian television actresses
Actresses in Tamil television
Actresses from Chennai
Actresses in Malayalam television
Year of birth missing (living people)